Catalpa is an unincorporated community in Mississippi County, in the U.S. state of Missouri.

The community was named for a grove of catalpa trees planted near the original town site.

References

Unincorporated communities in Mississippi County, Missouri
Unincorporated communities in Missouri